Torrezno (plural: torreznos) is a kind of fried bacon snack produced in Spain.

A staple of bar tops in Spain, torreznos temporarily lost popularity to some extent due to its highly caloric nature. They are also sold as snack in supermarkets. They are made of the outer part of the pig's entrails, marinated with salt and paprika, cured (or also smoked), and later fried. Associated to Soria, torreznos produced there have been granted a specific . Back in 2014 The Guardian described torreznos as "deliciously decadent fried pork belly chunks".

References 

Spanish snack foods